Farahan County (Ŝahrestāne Farāhān) is in Markazi province, Iran. The capital of the county is the city of Farmahin. At the 2006 census, the region's population (as Khenejin Rural District of Komijan County and Farahan District of Tafresh County) was 33,059 in 9,277 households. The following census in 2011 counted 30,042 people in the newly formed Farahan County, in 9,535 households. At the 2016 census, the county's population was 28,994 in 9,744 households.

Administrative divisions

The population history and structural changes of Farahan County's administrative divisions over three consecutive censuses are shown in the following table. The latest census shows two districts, four rural districts, and two cities.

References

 

Counties of Markazi Province